The Pigot Baronetcy, of Patshull Hall in the County of Stafford, is a title in the Baronetage of Great Britain. It was created on 5 December 1764 for the politician and colonial administrator George Pigot, with remainder to his brothers General Robert Pigot and Admiral Hugh Pigot, and remains extant. On 19 January 1766 Pigot was further honoured when he was raised to the Peerage of Ireland as Baron Pigot, with normal remainder to the heirs male of his body. Lord Pigot was unmarried (although he left several natural children; see below) and on his death in 1777 the barony became extinct. He was succeeded in the baronetcy according to the special remainder by his brother, Robert, the second Baronet. He was a distinguished soldier.

Pigot baronets, of Patshull (1764)
George Pigot, 1st Baron Pigot (1719–1777)
Sir Robert Pigot, 2nd Baronet (1720–1796)
Sir George Pigot, 3rd Baronet (1766–1841)
Sir Robert Pigot, 4th Baronet (1801–1891)
Sir George Pigot, 5th Baronet (1850–1934)
Sir Robert Pigot, 6th Baronet (1882–1977). He was a Brigadier General and was awarded the Military Cross.
Sir Robert Anthony Pigot, 7th Baronet (1915–1986). Nephew of the fifth Baronet. He was a major general in the Royal Marines.
Sir George Hugh Pigot, 8th Baronet (born 1946)

Extended family
Hugh Pigot (–1792)  brother of the first Baron and second Baronet, was an Admiral in the Royal Navy.
Richard Pigot (1774–1868), illegitimate son of the first Baron, was a General in the British Army.
Sir Hugh Pigot (1775–1857), illegitimate son of the first Baron, was an Admiral of the White.
Hugh Pigot (1769–1797), a Royal Navy Captain was slain during the mutiny on the Hermione. Nephew of the first Baron.

Notes

Baronetcies in the Baronetage of Great Britain
1764 establishments in Great Britain
Baronetcies created with special remainders